Willow is the third studio album by American singer-songwriter Willow. It was released on July 19, 2019, through MSFTS Music and Roc Nation. The album includes a feature from her brother Jaden, and is the follow up to her last project The 1st (2017). The album was written and produced entirely by Willow and Tyler Cole.

Background
The album and its promotional tour were announced on Smith's social media on June 24, with tour dates being released four days later. The tracks are interpolated and have themes such as female empowerment, relationship and being born in the wrong generation.

Composition
Willow's previous record The 1st channeled the sounds of 1990s alternative musicians, yielding comparisons to Tori Amos, Tracy Chapman, Alanis Morissette and others. With her self-titled album, she would leap into "spacey" and psychedelic terrain. The songs have been seen as both psych-folk and psych soul, as well as dream pop and "dreamy" R&B.

Track listing

Notes
 signifies a co-producer

Personnel
 Willow – vocals, production
 Jabs – vocals, production
 Mel "Chaos" Lewis – production
 James Chul Rim – production, recording, mixing
 Calvin Bailiff – engineering
 Phil Scott – engineering
 Zach Brown – production, recording, mixing
 Oren Pine – drums

Charts

References

2019 albums
Willow Smith albums
Roc Nation albums
Dream pop albums by American artists
Psychedelic folk albums
Psychedelic soul albums